Martin Detlef Zwicker (born 27 February 1987) is a German field hockey player who plays as a midfielder or forward for Berliner HC and the German national team.

International career
Zwicker represented his country at the 2016 Summer Olympics, where he won the bronze medal. He also played in the 2010 and 2014 World Cup. On 28 May 2021, he was named in the squads for the 2021 EuroHockey Championship and the 2020 Summer Olympics.

References

External links
 
 
 

1987 births
Living people
People from Köthen (Anhalt)
German male field hockey players
Male field hockey midfielders
Male field hockey forwards
2010 Men's Hockey World Cup players
2014 Men's Hockey World Cup players
Field hockey players at the 2016 Summer Olympics
Field hockey players at the 2020 Summer Olympics
Olympic field hockey players of Germany
Olympic bronze medalists for Germany
Olympic medalists in field hockey
Medalists at the 2016 Summer Olympics
Sportspeople from Saxony-Anhalt
2023 Men's FIH Hockey World Cup players
21st-century German people
2018 FIH Indoor Hockey World Cup players